Aggi Ásgerð Ásgeirsdóttir (born 1966) is a Faroese artist. She was born in Tórshavn, Faroe Islands. She was educated  in Denmark and then moved back to the Faroe Islands,  to the small village Vágur in Suðuroy, which is the southernmost island. In the summer 2009 Aggi move to Tórshavn or to Argir, now part of the municipality of Tórshavn. While Aggi was living in Suðuroy, her art was her main occupation, and also mentored Ruth Smith Art Museum in Vágur, she was the chairman of the association "Skálin við Skálá", which owns the museum. Aggi often showed the museum for tourists while she was living in Vágur.

Faroese Art on board Smyril - the Suðuroy Ferry
In 2005 the old ferry Smyril, which sails daily between Tórshavn and Suðuroy, was replaced by a new ferry with the same name. It was decided, that the ship should also be kind of art museum showing some of young Faroese art. Aggi Ásgerð Ásgeirsdóttir was one of the younger Faroese artists who were chosen to decorate Smyril with their art. Aggi made a collection of eight art works which she gave the title "Carpe Diem".

Faroese Art in The School Centre in Suðuroy
In 2009 a new school building was built in Suðuroy, between the villages Hov and Porkeri. There are two schools in the building: The High School of Suðuroy and the Health School of the Faroe Islands. Three people were chosen to decorate the school building; and Aggi Ásgerð Ásgeirsdóttir was one of them. The school has decorated a large wall in the schools cafeteria with paintings.

References

Further reading
 Myndlist.net About the book "Levende kunst - 49 nulevende færøske kunstnere" by Inger Smærup Sørensen. The book has an article about Aggi Ásgerð Ásgeirsdóttir.

External links
 The Ruth Smith Art Museum in Vágur
 Det Fynske Kunstakademi - The Funen Art Academy

1966 births
Living people
People from Tórshavn
Faroese painters
Faroese women painters
21st-century women artists